Mandılı (also, Mandyly) is a village in the Fuzuli District of Azerbaijan. The village was announced to be recaptured by Azerbaijan on October 28, 2020.

References 

Populated places in Fuzuli District